Desert Edge may refer to:
Desert Edge, California
Desert Edge High School, a high school in Arizona